Mount Maxwell is a  mountain summit of the Saint Elias Mountains in Kluane National Park of Yukon, Canada. The mountain is situated at the toe of the Kaskawulsh Glacier. The mountain cannot be seen from any roads, but can be seen from the Slims River valley. The nearest higher peak is Mount Leacock,  to the south. The "Mt Maxwell" designation is misplaced five kilometres to the northeast of the actual summit on the topographic map. The mountain was named by John Oliver Wheeler (1924- 2015), a Canadian geologist with the Geological Survey of Canada who climbed Maxwell in 1954. The Maxwell name was approved in 1960, and was made official in 1981 by the Geographical Names Board of Canada. However, it remains a mystery who Maxwell was. Based on the Köppen climate classification, Mount Maxwell is located in a subarctic climate with long, cold, snowy winters, and mild summers.

See also

List of mountains of Canada
Geography of Yukon

References

Gallery

External links
 Parks Canada website: Kluane
 Mount Maxwell weather: MountainForecast
 Flickr photo

Maxwell
Maxwell
Maxwell